Maria Noichl (born 9 January 1967) is a German politician and member of the European Parliament representing Germany since July 2014. She is a member of the Social Democratic Party, part of the Party of European Socialists.

Prior to entering politics Noichl was a teacher of nutrition and design.

Parliamentary service
Member, Committee on Women's Rights and Gender Equality (2014-)
Member, Committee on Agriculture and Rural Development (2014-)
Member, Delegation to the ACP–EU Joint Parliamentary Assembly (2014-)
Member, Delegation to the Euro-Latin American Parliamentary Assembly (2014-2014)

In addition to her committee assignments, Noichl is a member of the European Parliament Intergroup on the Welfare and Conservation of Animals.

Other activities
 German United Services Trade Union (ver.di), Member

References

1967 births
Living people
21st-century German educators
Social Democratic Party of Germany MEPs
MEPs for Germany 2014–2019
MEPs for Germany 2019–2024
21st-century women MEPs for Germany
People from Rosenheim